Ngamahanga is a rural community, in the northeastern part of Rangitikei District, in the Hawke's Bay region of New Zealand's North Island. The rest of the Rangitikei District is located in the Manawatū-Whanganui region.

Ngamahanga has been farmed by Europeans since the 1870s. It is one of the most vast and remote areas of New Zealand, far away from many of the comforts of modern civilisation.

The area includes Ngamatea Station, a 70,000 hectare high country sheep and beef station, with areas for free-range sika deer hunting and trout fishing.

Geography

Ngamahanga corresponds with the Statistics New Zealand statistical area of Ngamatea, which covers an area of 611.55 km², 13.64% of the total area of Rangitikei. At the 2018 census, only 24 people or 0.2% of the district's population lived in the area.

The Ngamatea statistical area is bordered by Taharua (Taupo District, Hawke's Bay) to the north, Puketitiri-Tutira (Hastings District, Hawke's Bay) to the northeast and east, Sherenden-Crownthorpe (Hastings) to the southeast and Mokai Patea to the west.

History

19th century

Māori had some farming in the area before the arrival of Europeans.

Europeans began farming sheep farming in the area in the 1870s. The initial Ngamatea Station had no boundaries, with sheep and cattle eventually grazing up to 100,000 hectares.

20th century

The Fernie family began farming the Ngamatea Station for wool in 1932, after previous farmers had been driven away by rabbits, low prices, and the hard work involved in farming the area.

Musterers would be hired for eight months of the year to bring sheep in from the far reaches of the station, and spending a year on the farm became a rite of passage for many young farmers. Ngamahanga became a community of farm workers, cooks, shearers, shepherds, gardeners, rabbit hunters, and "tough, eccentric landowners".

The area remained extremely remote, often taking people several days to travel to.

Colin Wheeler painted the homestead area of the station in 1973, including dogs’ kennels, shepherds’ quarters and other buildings.

In the 1970s and 1980s, Government subsidies were provided to permanently clear tussock and scrub.

21st century

By 2006, Ngamatea Station had transitioned to producing prime lamb. However, the Ngamahanga was still hilly, remote back-country, where "tough, self-reliant, real men and women" worked across vast distances.

In 2015, the station was still one of the largest and remote farms in New Zealand.

In July 2020, a 26-year-old Ngamahanga man died in a single-car crash on the road between Ngamahanga and Taihape.

Government and politics

Local government

As part of the Rangitikei District, the current Mayor of Rangitikei since 2013 is Andy Watson.

The area forms part of the Northern ward of the Rangitikei District Council, which elects three of the eleven district councillors. The three councillors of the Taihape ward are Richard Aslett, Angus Gordon and Ruth Rainey. The mayor and councillors are all due for re-election in October 2016.

Central government

The area is part of the general electorate of Rangitīkei and in the Māori electorate of Te Tai Hauāuru. Rangitīkei is a safe National Party seat since the 1938 election with the exception of 1978–1984 when it was held by Bruce Beetham of the Social Credit Party. Since 2011 it is held by Ian McKelvie.

Te Tai Hauāuru is a more unstable seat, having been held by three different parties since 1996, i.e. New Zealand First, the Māori Party and the Labour Party. Since 2014 it is held by Adrian Rurawhe of the Labour Party.

Demographics

There were 6 households. There were 15 males and 6 females, giving a sex ratio of 2.5 males per female. The median age was 24.5 years (compared with 37.4 years nationally), with 3 people (12.5%) aged under 15 years, 12 (50.0%) aged 15 to 29, 9 (37.5%) aged 30 to 64, and none aged 65 or older.

Ethnicities were 75.0% European/Pākehā and 12.5% Māori.

Although some people objected to giving their religion, 50.0% had no religion and 25.0% were Christian.

Of those at least 15 years old, 6 (28.6%) people had no formal qualifications. The median income was $36,200, compared with $31,800 nationally. The employment status of those at least 15 was that 12 (57.1%) people were employed full-time, and 6 (28.6%) were part-time.

Transport

Roads

There are no state highways in the area. The main road through the area is Taihape-Napier Road, also known as the Gentle Annie.

Springvale Suspension Bridge
The historic Springvale Suspension Bridge, in use from 1925 to 1970, crosses the Rangitīkei River at Ngamahanga. It is a designated Category II historic site by Heritage New Zealand.

References

External links
Ngamatea Station website

Rangitikei District
Populated places in the Hawke's Bay Region